Ostuni Sport is an Italian association football club, based in Ostuni, Apulia, founded in 1945.

Ostuni in the season 2010–11, from Serie D group H relegated to Eccellenza Apulia.

The team's colors are yellow and blue.

External links
Unofficial homepage

Football clubs in Apulia
Association football clubs established in 1945
1945 establishments in Italy